Robert Clavering was MP for Northumberland from 1386 to 1388.

Clavering was born in Newcastle-upon-Tyne on 3 February 1326.He was Collector of taxes for Northumberland from 1379 to 1383. He was Chancellor, Chamberlain, Clerk of the Works and Keeper of Provisions at Berwick-upon-Tweed from 1386 to 1388. He died on 17 January 1394.

References

1326 births
1394 deaths
English MPs October 1382
Politicians from Newcastle upon Tyne